The 2015–16 Seattle Redhawks men's basketball team represented Seattle University during the 2015–16 NCAA Division I men's basketball season. The Redhawks, led by seventh year head coach Cameron Dollar, played their home games at KeyArena, with two home games at the Showare Center and CBI games at the Connolly Center, and were members of the Western Athletic Conference. They finished the season 15–17, 7–7 in WAC play to finish in fourth place. They defeated Texas–Rio Grande Valley in the quarterfinals of the WAC tournament to advance to the semifinals where they lost to Cal State Bakersfield. They were invited to the College Basketball Invitational where they defeated Idaho in the first round to advance to the quarterfinals where they lost to Vermont.

Previous season
The Redhawks finished the season 18–16, 7–7 in WAC play to finish in a tie for fourth place. They advanced to the championship game of the WAC tournament where they lost to New Mexico State. They were invited to the College Basketball Invitational where they defeated Pepperdine in the first round and Colorado in the quarterfinals before losing in the semifinals to Loyola–Chicago.

Departures

2015 incoming recruits

Roster

Schedule

|-
!colspan=9 style="background:#BA0C2F; color:#FFFFFF;"| Non-conference regular season

|-
!colspan=9 style="background:#BA0C2F; color:#FFFFFF;"| WAC regular season

|-
!colspan=9 style="background:#BA0C2F; color:#FFFFFF;"| WAC tournament

|-
!colspan=9 style="background:#BA0C2F; color:#FFFFFF;"| CBI

References

Seattle Redhawks men's basketball seasons
Seattle
Seattle Redhawks
Seattle Redhawks
Seattle Redhawks
Seattle
Seattle Redhawks